"Letter 2 My Unborn" is a song by Tupac Shakur, released as a posthumous single from his album Until the End of Time in 2001.

The accompanying music video received moderate airplay though it was less successful than the lead single from the album, the title track. The single peaked at number 64 in the airplay chart.

Lyrical content
In the song, Tupac speaks to his then-unborn child as a precaution for fear that he would not be able to meet or speak with them in the event of his death prior to their birth. Shakur relays stories of his own life and advises the child to avoid the troubles that he faced.

Composition
The song samples Michael Jackson's 1987 hit "Liberian Girl" (from Bad, 1987), but is set at a higher tempo and features a female vocal backing track by Tena Jones (formerly of 4th Avenue Jones).

Track listing
12"
 "Letter 2 My Unborn" - 3:55
 "Letter 2 My Unborn" (instrumental) - 3:55
 "Hell 4 a Hustler" - 4:56
Promo
Side A
 "Letter 2 My Unborn" - 3:57
 "Letter 2 My Unborn" (instrumental) -	3:57
 "Letter 2 My Unborn" (a cappella) - 3:56
Side B
 "Niggaz Nature" (remix) (radio edit) - 3:45
 "Niggaz Nature" (remix) - 5:04
 "Niggaz Nature" (remix) (instrumental) - 5:08
 "Niggaz Nature" (remix) (a cappella) - 4:57

Chart positions

References

Songs about children
Songs about fathers
Songs about letters (message)
Songs released posthumously
Tupac Shakur songs
2001 singles
Songs written by Michael Jackson
2001 songs
Interscope Records singles
Death Row Records singles
Songs written by Tupac Shakur